Craig Algernon Ogletree (April 2, 1968 – August 9, 2021) was an American professional football player who was a linebacker in the National Football League (NFL). 

Ogletree played for the Cincinnati Bengals in 1990. He died from complications of COVID-19 on August 9, 2021.

Combine results

References

1968 births
2021 deaths
American football linebackers
Auburn Tigers football players
Cincinnati Bengals players
Deaths from the COVID-19 pandemic in Georgia (U.S. state)
People from Barnesville, Georgia
Players of American football from Georgia (U.S. state)
Sportspeople from the Atlanta metropolitan area